Chozen is a 2014 television series.

Chozen may also refer to:

Harry Chozen (1915 – 1994), a baseball player
Jan Chozen Bays (b. 1945), a pediatrician and Zen teacher
Young Chozen, a hip hop artist
Chozen Toguchi, a fictional character in the film The Karate Kid Part II (1986) and its spinoff streaming TV series Cobra Kai (2021 – present), portrayed by Yuji Okumoto

See also
Chosen (disambiguation)